John Combe may refer to:

 John Combe (MP)
John Frederick Boyce Combe, British Army officer
John Combe (mayor), List of mayors of St. Joseph, Missouri